Celivarone is an experimental drug being tested for use in pharmacological antiarrhythmic therapy. Cardiac arrhythmia is any abnormality in the electrical activity of the heart. Arrhythmias range from mild to severe, sometimes causing symptoms like palpitations, dizziness, fainting, and even death. They can manifest as slow (bradycardia) or fast (tachycardia) heart rate, and may have a regular or irregular rhythm.

Molecular causes of cardiac arrhythmias 
The causes of cardiac arrhythmias are numerous, from structural changes in the conduction system (the sinoatrial and atrioventricular nodes, or His-Purkinje system) and cardiac muscle, to mutations in genes coding for ion channels of the heart. Movement of ions, particularly Na+, Ca2+ and K+, causes depolarizations of cell membranes in node cells, which are then transmitted to cardiac muscle cells to induce contraction. After depolarization, the ions are moved back to their original locations, leading to repolarization of the membrane and relaxation. Disruptions in ion flow affect the heart's ability to contract by altering the resting membrane potential, affecting the cell's ability to conduct or transmit an action potential (AP), or by affecting the rate or force of contraction.

The specific molecular changes involved in arrhythmias depend on the nature of the problem. Ion channel mutations can alter protein conformation, and so change the amount of current flowing through these channels. Due to changes in amino acids and binding domains, mutations may also affect the ability of these channels to respond to physiological changes in cardiac demand. Mutations resulting in loss of function of K+ channels can result in delayed repolarization of the cardiac muscle cells. Similarly, gain of function of Na+ and Ca2+ channels results in delayed repolarization, and Ca2+ overload causing increased Ca2+ binding to cardiac troponin C, more actin-myosin interactions and causing an increased contractility, respectively. Mutations cause many arrhythmic conditions, including atrial fibrillation (AF), atrial flutter (AFl), and ventricular fibrillation (V-Fib). Arrhythmias can also be induced by altered activity of the vagus nerve and activation of β1 adrenergic receptors.

Mechanism of action 
Celivarone is a non-iodinated benzofuran derivative, structurally related to amiodarone, a drug commonly used to treat arrhythmias. Celivarone has potential as an antiarrhythmic agent, attributable to its multifactorial mechanism of action; blocking Na+, L-type Ca2+ and many types of K+ channels (IKr, IKs, IKACh and IKv1.5), as well as inhibiting β1 receptors, all in dose-dependent manners. The mechanisms by which celivarone modifies ion flow through these channels is unknown, but hearts demonstrate longer PQ intervals and decreased cell shortening, indicative of blocked L-type Ca2+ channels, depressed maximum current with each action potential with no change in the resting membrane potential, caused by blocked Na+ channels, and longer action potential duration due to K+ channel blocks. Celivarone is therefore described as having class I, II, III, and IV antiarrhythmic properties.

Indications for use 
Celivarone displays some atrial selectivity, suggesting it may be most effective at targeting atrial arrhythmias like atrial fibrillation and atrial flutter. These conditions are characterized by rapid atrial rates, 400–600 bpm for atrial fibrillation and 150–300 bpm for atrial flutter. Studies have shown celivarone is capable of cardioversion, maintaining normal sinus cardiac rhythms, being effective in hypokalemic, vasotonic, and stretch-induced atrial fibrillation, as well as ischemic and reperfusion ventricular fibrillation. Since it affects multiple ion channels, it also shows promise in treating genetic forms of arrhythmia caused by several ion channel mutations.

Future research 
Celivarone may be an effective antihypertensive therapy, as it inhibits both angiotensin II and phenylephrine induced hypertension in dogs, despite having no affinity for these receptors. Atrial fibrillation is especially common in hypertensive adults so a single drug to combat both problems is desirable. The non-iodinated nature of celivarone means that the harmful side-effects on the thyroid commonly seen with amiodarone therapy are eliminated, making the drug an attractive alternative. Higher oral bioavailability, shorter duration of action, and lower accumulation in body tissues are also benefits of celivarone. Presently, two studies are underway to determine if the effects observed in the animal models are reproducible in a human population.

See also 
 Amiodarone
 Benzbromarone
 Benziodarone
 Budiodarone
 Dronedarone

References 

Antiarrhythmic agents
Benzofurans
Sanofi
Amines
Carboxylate esters
Isopropyl esters
Diarylketones
Butyl compounds